The Architectural and Engineering Works Department was the main civil engineering department of the British Royal Navy responsible constructing, and maintaining naval buildings, dockyards, ports and managing civil engineering staff from 1837 to 1919 it was superseded by the Civil Engineer in Chief's Department.

History
A specific post with responsibility for the navies expanding civil works programs led to the creation of an Inspector-General of Naval Works in 1796 who's managed civil engineering works in the dockyards under the supervision of the Navy Board. In 1813 the department was renamed to Department of the Surveyor of Buildings administered by the Surveyor of Buildings. Following the abolition of the Navy Board the department was placed under Admiralty control. In 1837 the department, it was renamed the Architectural and Engineering Works Department under a then new Director of Works responsible to the Civil Lord Civil Lord of the Admiralty who managed the Royal Navy's buildings and works departments and land estates. . In 1919 the department was renamed the Civil Engineer in Chief's Department. In January 1960 it became the Navy Works Department under a Director-General, Navy Works. In April 1963 the department ceased to exist when responsibility for building and civil engineering works for the armed services was transferred to the Ministry of Public Building and Works, later Department of the Environment.

Head of department

Civil Architect
Incomplete list of post holders included: 
Mr. G. L. Taylor Esq. 1837–1837

Superintendent of Works, Buildings, and Machinery
Incomplete list of post holders included: 
 Captain H. R. Brandreth, RE. 1840–1844

Director of Architectural and Engineering Naval Works
Incomplete list of post holders included:
Captain H. R. Brandreth, RE. 1845

Timeline
 Navy Board, Inspector General of Naval Works, 1796–1813	
 Navy Board, Surveyor of Buildings, 1813–1832
 Board of Admiralty, Surveyor of Buildings, 1832–1837
 Board of Admiralty, Architectural and Engineering Works Department, 1837–1919
 Board of Admiralty, Civil Engineer in Chiefs Department, 1919–1960
 Board of Admiralty, Navy Works Department, 1960–1963

See also
 Admiralty

References

Sources
 Archives, The National. "Admiralty: Architectural and Engineering Works Department, later Civil Engineer in Chief's Department: Photographs of Works". discovery.nationalarchives.gov.uk. National Archives UK, ADM 195, 1857-1961.
 Morriss, Roger (2004). Naval Power and British Culture, 1760-1850: Public Trust and Government Ideology. Farnham, England: Ashgate. .
 "REVIEWS The Royal Dockyards 1690-1850: Architecture and Engineering Works of the Sailing Nav". The Mariner's Mirror. The Society for Nautical Research. Vols: 76-77: 285. 1990.

Admiralty departments
1837 establishments in the United Kingdom
1919 disestablishments in the United Kingdom